Scott McGillivray (born April 7, 1978) is a Canadian entrepreneur, investor, television host, author and educator.

McGillivray is the host and executive producer of the series Income Property, a home renovation show on HGTV Canada and the DIY Network (Canada); and HGTV and DIY Network in the United States.  He is a judge on HGTV's All American Handyman with Mike Holmes and on Canada's Handyman Challenge along with Mike Holmes, Bryan Baeumler and Paul Lafrance.

Background 
McGillivray attended the University of Guelph where he received an honours degree in Commerce in 2001. What began as a school project about income properties developed into a business model that he would later execute himself. At 21, using student loans, McGillivray purchased and renovated his first rental property, and owned 5 rental properties by the time he was 23.  He became a licensed contractor in 2004 to manage his own crews. He now owns hundreds of income properties across Canada and the United States.

McGillivray has been an HGTV host in the US and Canada since 2008, starring in over 400 episodes of television, and is best known for the HGTV series Income Property, Moving the McGillivrays and Buyers Bootcamp. He is currently in pre-production on the fourth season of his digital series and Canadian Screen Award nominee, Scott’s House Call.

McGillivray is CEO of McGillivray Group and McGillivray Entertainment; co-founder of Keyspire which provides real estate investing education; and is a real estate investor in properties across North America.

Personal life 
McGillivray was born and raised in Toronto, Ontario, Canada.   He is married to Sabrina McGillivray with two daughters. The family divides their time between residences in Toronto, Ontario, and Fort Myers, Florida.
He has an older brother, Andrew, who he works with and a younger sister, Erin.

Television series

Income Property (2009-2016)

Income Property is a TV show in which McGillivray helps homeowners turn part of their home into a money-maker to help with the mortgage, on HGTV Canada. In each episode, he presents the homeowners with renovation options to turn their space into a legal rental unit. The audience sees the renovation and the final reveals. The show premiered in 2009 and the 100th episode aired in 2013. Income Property expanded from a half-hour to an hour format in 2013. In 2014, it returned to being a half-hour show.

In the half-hour format, McGillivray comes in to help homeowners with their existing properties, renovating them for a profitable rental unit. In the full-hour format, he helps people buy homes and then renovate them to include a profitable rental unit. There have been several themed seasons, alongside regular non-themed ones, and the full-hour show can be seen as a themed season, along with others, that focused on particular kinds of rental properties.

As of 2013, it aired in 33 countries around the world.

Moving the McGillivrays (2016)

With Moving the McGillivrays, McGillivray and his wife and daughters buy and renovate a house into their forever home, on HGTV Canada. They end up choosing a fixer-upper that they tear down due to reno costs, to build their dream home.

Buyers Bootcamp with Scott McGillivray (2018)

On Buyers Bootcamp, instead of McGillivray helping buyers purchase new properties and turn them into income properties (as in the full hour version of Income Property), he helps buyers renovate and flip properties.

In the 2016 pilot, for HGTV Canada, he helped owners choose a property to buy and renovate, to flip for a profit. In the series order, for HGTV (USA), he comes on board as a partner to help renovate investment properties and flip them for profit. One season aired in 2018.

Vacation House Rules (2020)

Vacation House Rules is similar to Income Property. The unique factor for this show is that the homes featured are all vacation cottages. McGillivray and the owners renovate properties into upscale investment vacation rentals. The third season airs on HGTV Canada in spring 2022, with the 4th season currently in production.

Renovation Resort (2023) 

Renovation Resort enlists Bryan Baeumler to help McGillivray turn his recently purchased lakeside resort from a total wreck into a one-of-a-kind vacation rental. Renovation Resort is set to premiere on HGTV Canada in spring 2023. It is similar to Baeumler's other show, Island of Bryan/Renovation Island, in that it renovates a resort. The show will be a 7-episode competition series, featuring 4 teams of contractor-designer duos advised by McGillivray and Baeumler, who will renovate cabin-by-cabin competing head-to-head. The winning cabin will get the winning team the grand prize. So far, there’s no word yet on when or if the show will air on HGTV in U.S

Other series 
McGillivray has been featured on other shows for HGTV and HGTV Canada.

Debbie Travis’ Facelift (2003-2005) and From the Ground Up with Debbie Travis (2006) 
McGillivray got his start in TV as a crew member and later, as project manager with Debbie Travis on her home improvement reality TV shows.

Holiday Battle on the Block HGTV (2007) 
McGillivray and Kim Myles co-host this homeowner competition for the best holiday-decorated home.

All American Handyman (2010-2012) 
McGillivray is a co-host on HGTV's show All American Handyman with Mike Holmes.

Canada’s Handyman Challenge (2012-2014) 
McGillivray is a judge on the HGTV Canada show Canada's Handyman Challenge along with Mike Holmes, Bryan Baeumler and Paul LaFrance.

Flipping the Block (2014) 
In Flipping the Block, McGillivray is a judge rating the renovation abilities of four couples competing to win money at auction in a home-flipping competition. The teams transform identical run-down condos — then sell them to the highest bidder.  Scott McGillivray guest judges alongside Nicole Curtis, David Bromstad and host Josh Temple.

Home To Win (2015) 
On HGTV Canada's Home to Win, McGillivray was a guest renovator, renovating a house for a worthy family to win, who were selected by the producers.

The Real Estate Rebel 
The Real Estate Rebel is a podcast by McGillivray.

Books 
In 2014, McGillivray wrote his first home improvement book in which he advises homeowners how to make the most of their renovation investments.
 How to Add Value to your Home (2014), HarperCollins Canada

McGillivray has co-authored a number of real estate investing books with business partner Michael Sarracini.
 Cash Flow for Life (2012)
 Quick Start To Cash Flow (2011)
 The Investors Tool Kit (2011)

Business Projects
Keyspire (Lifetime Wealth Academy)
In 2010, McGillivray started his own real estate education company called The Lifetime Wealth Academy, which was later renamed to Keyspire in 2013. Keyspire runs investing training sessions and workshops. Keyspire is also a leading real estate network in North America.

Live Speaking Events
McGillivray started his own live speaking events titled "Creating Wealth through Real Estate" in 2009 to educate people about real estate investing. This event became #TheWealthTour in 2015.

See also
 Mike Holmes
 Bryan Baeumler
 Paul LaFrance

References

1978 births
Living people
Businesspeople from Toronto
Canadian people of Scottish descent
Canadian construction businesspeople
Canadian educators
Canadian interior designers
Canadian investors
Canadian television hosts
Canadian television producers
University of Guelph alumni